Verveer may refer to:
 3974 Verveer
 Melanne Verveer
 Salomon Verveer